Lior Navok (born September 6, 1971) (Hebrew: ליאור נבוק) is an Israeli classical composer, conductor and pianist. He was born in Tel Aviv. His music has been performed internationally by orchestras and ensembles including the Oper Frankfurt, Nuernberg Opera, Israel Philharmonic Orchestra, Boston Modern Orchestra Project, and the Tanglewood Festival Orchestra. Amongst the awards he has received are those from the Israel Cultural Excellence Foundation and the Massachusetts Cultural Council. He has also received awards from the Fromm Music Foundation, Lili Boulanger Memorial Fund Award, and Israel Prime Minister Award. In 2004, he was one of seven composers awarded commissions for new musical works by the Serge Koussevitzky Foundation in the Library of Congress and the Koussevitzky Music Foundation.

His stage music includes two operas, The Bet, based on a short story by Anton Chekhov, and An unserem Fluss (By Our River). The latter was commissioned by Oper Frankfurt, and was premiered during the company's 2014/15 season. He has also written two stage works for children The Little Mermaid (based in the story by Hans Christian Andersen) and The Adventures of Pinocchio (based on the children's novel by Carlo Collodi). His oratorio reflecting on The Holocaust, And The Trains Kept Coming…, was commissioned by Boston's Cantata Singers and premiered in 2008.

Navok is the pianist and founding member of the Butterfly Effect Ensemble, which specializes in creating live scores for silent films from the early days of the cinema up to 1929.

Compositions

Stage music
An unserem Fluss (By our River) (2013) -- c. 93' -- Chamber opera in two acts; Text by the composer.
The Adventures of Pinocchio (2009) -- c. 62' -- for 3 actors / flute, oboe, clarinet, horn, bassoon and piano
The Bet (2012) -- c. 90' -- Chamber opera in 14 scenes; after a short story by Anton Chekhov
The Little Mermaid (2007) -- c. 36' -- for actor / narrator; 2 pianos; flute, clarinet, percussion and string quintet (or string orchestra)

Symphonic
And the Trains Kept Coming... -- (2007) c. 44' -- oratorio for tenor, bass-baritone, boy-soprano, chorus and orchestra
Aurora Borealis -- (2007) c. 12' -- for accordion, harp, percussion and strings
Between Two Coasts -- (2009) c. 14' -- for string orchestra
Clarinet Concerto -- (1996) c. 22' -- for Clarinet Solo; 2 flutes (2nd doubles piccolo); 2 oboes; 2 bassoons; 2 horns; 2 trumpets; 2 Percussion; Strings
First-Fruits - a Symphonic Prelude -- (1997) c. 12' -- for Symphony Orchestra
...of weaving the shadowed waves -- (2003) c. 7.5' -- for two marimbas and chamber orchestra
Symphonic Bagatelles -- (2000) c. 18' -- for symphony orchestra
The Spanish Songs -- (1998) c. 11'-- for soprano, bassoon and chamber orchestra

Wind ensemble
Gleams from the Bosom of Darkness -- (2002) c. 21' -- for choir and symphonic band
Tetris -- (2009) c. 18' -- for double wind quintet, 2 flutes, 2 oboes, 2 clarinets, 2 horns and 2 bassoons

Choral music
It Is Winter That We Dream Of Spring -- (1997) c. 4' -- for mixed chamber chorus
Meditations Over Shore -- (1997) c. 4' -- for soli quartet, double chamber chorus, double large chorus, harmonica, percussion (2) and piano
Nocturne -- (1999) c. 9' -- for 12 singers (SATB), soprano saxophone, clarinet, harp guitar and percussion
Three songs—for mixed chamber chorus -- (1994) c. 20' mixed chamber chorus

Vocal music
A Dome of Many-Coloured Glass -- (2002) c. 10' -- for tenor and piano
A'l Mishcavi Baleylot (Upon my bed by night) -- (1992) c. 5' -- for soprano and harp
Bestiarius -- (1995) c. 11' -- for alto/mezzo-soprano solo, flute/piccolo, clarinet, bassoon; violin, percussion (2) and harpsichord
Copenhagen Songs -- (2010) c. 7' -- for alto and piano
Dialogues -- (1999) c. 11' -- for soprano and percussion
Found in a Train Station -- (2007) c. 12' -- for soprano, mandolin, violin, cello and piano
The Sea of Sunset -- (1997) c. 7' -- for soprano, trombone, double bass and piano
Spring Calls -- (2006) c. 10' -- for soprano, flute, viola, cello and harp
Three songs -- (1995) c. 10' -- for soprano and piano

Chamber music
After a tango -- (1995) c. 16' -- for recorders (3), clarinet, trumpet, trombone, guitar, Percussion, violin, double bass
At the Edge of a Spiral -- (2004) c. 10' -- for one piano, four hands
Arabesque -- (2005) c. 10' -- for alto recorder, baroque cello and harpsichord
Blurred Formations -- (2002) c. 5' -- for guitar and accordion
Capriccio -- (2002) c. 10' -- for flute and violin
Elegy to the Future -- (2001) c. 13' -- for piccolo/alto flute; clarinet; violin; cello; percussion; piano
Flashes of decay  (1996)   -- (1996) c. 12' -- for flute/piccolo; English horn; clarinet/bass clarinet; horn; tuba; percussion (2); harp; piano
Hidden Reflections -- (1996) c. 15' -- for alto saxophone and piano or clarinet and piano
Hope Cycles (String Quartet no.2) -- (2004) c. 24' -- for string quartet
Humoresque -- (1995) c. 5' -- for clarinet and piano
Like a Whirling Sand Clock -- (2006) c. 10' -- for clarinet, cello and piano
Little Suite -- (2006) c. 12' -- for clarinet, violin, viola and cello
Mysterious Pond -- (2004) c. 10' -- for flute, oboe and piano
Piano Quintet -- (2000) c. 18' -- for violins (2), viola, cello and piano
Piano Trio -- (1999) c. 22' -- for violin, cello and piano
Quartet for flute, clarinet bassoon and harp -- (1994) c. 27'
Saxophone Quartet -- (1999) c. 10' -- for soprano, alto, tenor and baritone saxophones
Sextet -- (1998) c. 22' -- for flute/ piccolo/ bass flute; clarinet/ bass clarinet; violin; cello; Percussion.; Piano
Six short stories for Woodwind Quintet -- (1996) 12' -- for flute/piccolo; oboe; clarinet; horn; bassoon
Three Episodes for Chamber Ensemble -- (1997) c. 12' -- for flute; oboe; clarinet; bassoon; horn; percussion (1); piano; violin; viola; cello and double bass
Three Winged Movements -- (2003) 12' -- for flute and piano
Trio for Clarinet, Bassoon and Horn -- (2001) c. 5' -- for clarinet, bassoon and horn
V5 - Quintet for Vibraphone and String Quartet -- (1995) c. 16' -- for vibraphone; violins (2); viola; cello
Veiled Echoes -- (2000) c. 15' -- for flute, viola and harp
Violin Sonata -- (2004) c. 18' -- for violin and piano duo
Voices from India (String Quartet no.1) -- (1997) c. 17' -- for violins (2); viola; cello

Electroacoustic music
Through the Alleys of Time -- (2007) c. 22' -- for guitar and tape

Solo music
Dunes -- (2005) c. 5' -- for solo flute
East of the Cane Fields -- (2001) c. 8' -- for solo harp
Fantasy -- (1998) c. 5' -- for solo cello
Meditation -- (2000) c. 5' -- for solo guitar
Periscopes -- (2009) c. 30' -- for solo piano
Prelude for Harpsichord solo -- (1995) c. 5' -- for solo harpsichord
Remembrances of Jerusalem -- (1995) c. 11' -- for solo guitar
Rosewood Staircase -- (2000) c. 6' -- for solo marimba
Six for a Dance -- (2000) c. 3' -- for solo guitar
Six pieces for horn solo -- (1995) c. 15' -- for solo French horn
Speak Low! -- (1998) c. 12' -- for solo double bass
Ten Bagatelles -- (2000) c. 18' -- for solo piano
The Old Photo Box -- (2006) c. 58' -- for solo piano

Discography
Hidden Reflections (1996)
Meditations Over Shore (2001)
The Old Photo Box (2008)
The Natives are Restless (with Butterfly Effect Ensemble) (2010)
Urban Nocturnes (2011)   
Music and Poetry – face to face (2011)
Chimera (with Butterfly Effect Ensemble) (2013)

References

Interview with Israeli Composer Lior Navok, WGBH, January 16, 2008
Frank Lovece, The tale of 'The Little Mermaid', Newsday, January 20, 2008
Richard Dyer, NEC composers showcase new sounds, Boston Globe, May 13, 1998. Retrieved via subscription 19 June 2008.

External links
Lior Navok official site
Lior Navok in conversation from WGBH Radio, Boston

Living people
Israeli Jews
1971 births
20th-century classical composers
21st-century classical composers
Israeli composers
People from Tel Aviv
Male classical composers
20th-century male musicians
21st-century male musicians